Apollon (Russian: Аполло́н) was a Russian avant-garde literary magazine that served as a principal publication of the Russian modernist movement in the early 20th century. It was published between 1909 and 1917 in Saint Petersburg.

History and profile
Apollon was established by the literary critic S. K. Makovsky in 1909 and soon became a venue for the polemics that marked the decline of the symbolist movement in Russian poetry. It was first a monthly supplement of the Literaturny Almanakh. Then its frequency became ten times a year. The headquarters of the magazine was in St Petersburg. In 1910, two seminal essays that appeared in Apollon -- Mikhail Kuzmin's On Beautiful Clarity (O prekrasnoy yasnosti) and Nikolai Gumilyov's The Life of Verse (Zhizn' stikha) -- heralded the emergence of Acmeist poetry. The magazine ceased publication in 1917.

References

External links

1909 establishments in the Russian Empire
1917 disestablishments in Russia
Avant-garde magazines
Defunct literary magazines published in Europe
Defunct magazines published in Russia
Literary magazines published in Russia
Magazines established in 1909
Magazines disestablished in 1917
Magazines published in Saint Petersburg
Poetry literary magazines
Russian-language magazines
Russian poetry
Russian symbolism
Monthly magazines published in Russia
Ten times annually magazines